St. Victor Petroglyphs Provincial Park is an historical provincial park in the Canadian province of Saskatchewan. The  park is situated on the northern slope of the Wood Mountain Hills on a cliff at the top of a partially wooded coulee. The Wood Mountain Hills are a plateau east of the Cypress Hills along the Missouri Coteau in the semi-arid Palliser's Triangle. The site was designated an historic site in the 1960s and became a provincial park in 1986.

St. Victor Petroglyphs Provincial Park features over 300 petroglyphs that were estimated to have been carved between AD 500 and 1750. They are on a large sandstone outcrop and are the only known example of horizontal petroglyphs on the Canadian Prairies. They also represent the largest concentration of pre-contact rock art in Saskatchewan.

History 
There is evidence that the petroglyphs were not carved all at one time but rather over a period of hundreds of years by different people as there are carvings on top of carvings. It is not known exactly who carved them but this rock art is typically attributed to the people of the Siouan languages. There are carved animal tracks, animal and human figures, geometric shapes, and genitalia. "The association of vulva forms with cloven-hoofed animal tracks relates to Siouan mythological themes of fertility and the sacred relationship between women and bison". The petroglyphs, then, were likely ritualistic and focused on productivity of game and successful hunts

The petroglyphs today 
First Nations today still consider the site sacred. The natural erosion of the sandstone is causing the petroglyphs to fade and the erosion of the cliff has caused a large piece of carved sandstone to break away. The province has no plans to preserve the site as the local First Nations have requested that nature be allowed to take its course. To slow the erosion and wear down and to let it occur naturally, the public is not able to access the carvings directly. There is a lookout built at the cliff that over looks the site and allows viewing. In the nearby community of St. Victor, there is the St. Victor Petroglyphs Interpretative Centre, which preserves the history of the St. Victor Petroglyphs.

See also 
History of Saskatchewan
List of National Historic Sites of Canada in Saskatchewan
List of historic places in rural municipalities of Saskatchewan
List of protected areas of Saskatchewan
Tourism in Saskatchewan

References

External links 
St. Victor Petroglyphs

Provincial parks of Saskatchewan
Petroglyphs in Canada
Rock art in North America
Canadian Register of Historic Places in Saskatchewan
National Historic Sites in Saskatchewan
Willow Bunch No. 42, Saskatchewan
Division No. 3, Saskatchewan